Picking up Sticks is an English country dance for three couples in a line, recorded by John Playford in 1651.

Tune 

This is NOT the tune for Picking up Sticks. This tune is called Lavena (also from 1651) and Cecil Sharp substituted the tune at the beginning of the 20th century.

Steps 

reconstructed by Greg Lindahl

External sources 

Picking up Sticks on The Traditional Tune Archive

References 

English country dance
Partner dance
Dance forms in classical music